John William Tammen Jr. (born 1962) is a retired United States Navy rear admiral who last served as the Deputy Chief of Staff, Strategic Plans and Policy of the Allied Command Transformation from June 12, 2019 to August 2021. Previously, he served as the Director of Undersea Warfare of the United States Navy from January 2018 to June 2019.

Raised in Washington Township, New Jersey, Tammen graduated from the Rensselaer Polytechnic Institute with a B.S. degree in mechanical engineering in 1984. He later earned a master's degree in engineering management from Old Dominion University.

Tammen married Linda Louise Correll on December 18, 1994 in Kitsap County, Washington.

He is the son of John William Tammen Sr. (d. 2003) and Doris Barbara Hilla (d.1998)

References

External links
 

1962 births
Living people
Place of birth missing (living people)
People from Washington Township, Gloucester County, New Jersey
Rensselaer Polytechnic Institute alumni
Old Dominion University alumni
United States submarine commanders
Recipients of the Legion of Merit
United States Navy admirals
Recipients of the Defense Superior Service Medal
Military personnel from New Jersey